Hylaeaicum stoloniferum is a species of flowering plant in the family Bromeliaceae, native to Colombia, Ecuador, Peru and Venezuela. It was first described by Lyman Bradford Smith in 1963 as Neoregelia stolonifera.

References

Bromelioideae
Flora of Colombia
Flora of Ecuador
Flora of Venezuela
Plants described in 1963